Octocon, is the name of events organised by and for fans of science fiction (and fantasy).
 
Octocon, Santa Rosa, California, was first held in October 1977.
 
Octocon, the National Irish Science Fiction Convention, first held in 1989, is held (almost) annually in October. It has mostly been staged in Dublin, but for four years was in the university town of Maynooth.  It was not held in 2003, and in 2014, when Ireland hosted that year's Eurocon, Shamrokon, in Dublin.

Octocon, Northern California 

First held, on 1977-10-27, at El Rancho Tropicana Hotel, Santa Rosa, California

Octocon, Dublin, Ireland 

1989/1990: The convention was initiated by members of the Irish Science Fiction Association, and named by artist Peter McCanney, who created the convention's first logo.
1990: Terry Pratchett was the first Guest of Honour of the convention.
1995: Advertised Guest of Honour Mary Gentle had to cancel her appearance at the last minute, leading to the appointment of Kim Newman in her place.
1997: This was also the year's official Eurocon, and consequently the largest Octocon to date.
1998: The only one-day Octocon to date.
2003: The convention took a break for a year.
2004: For the first time, Octocon was held outside Ireland's capital of Dublin, in Maynooth, Co. Kildare, where it was held for 3 further years.
2008: The convention returned to Dublin.
2009: The first Golden Blaster was awarded.
2014: There was no October convention this year. Instead a lot of the regular organizers helped run the official Eurocon, Shamrokon, in August.

Golden Blasters 
The Golden Blasters are the National Irish Science Fiction Awards for short science fiction, fantasy or horror films. Submissions can and have come from anywhere in the world, and the winners are selected by audience vote and a panel of judges.

The awards now include the Golden Blaster, The Silver Blaster and the award for the best script.

In 2018 it was decided to have a "Best of best" award given in place of the usual structure. The overall winner was the 2017 Einstein Rosen short film.

Events

Locations
 Royal Marine Hotel, Dun Laoghaire, Co. Dublin
 Dublin Castle
 Royal Dublin Hotel, Dublin 
 Doubletree by Hilton, Dublin
 Glenroyal Hotel, Maynooth, Co. Kildare 
 Camden Court Hotel, Dublin
 Crowne Plaza Blanchardstown, Dublin

References

External links 
 

Science fiction conventions in Europe
Entertainment events in Ireland
Irish science fiction
Autumn events in the Republic of Ireland